HMS Daphne was a  composite screw sloop and the fifth ship of the Royal Navy to bear the name. Developed and constructed for the Royal Navy on a design by William Henry White, Director of Naval Construction, she was launched at Sheerness Dockyard on 29 May 1888. It was the first command of Admiral Sir William Christopher Pakenham, KCB, KCMG, KCVO.

References

Publications

 

Nymphe-class sloops
Ships built in Sheerness
1888 ships
Victorian-era sloops of the United Kingdom